Christopher Ramos de la Flor (born 18 January 1997) is a Spanish footballer who plays as a forward for Cádiz CF.

Club career
Born in Cádiz, Andalusia, Ramos played youth football for Portuarios de Cádiz, Géminis San Miguel CF, AD Raúl Navas, Cádiz CF and AD Tiempo Libre. In 2016, after finishing his formation, he joined Tercera División side CE Mercadal.

Ramos made his senior debut on 21 August 2016, coming on as a second-half substitute in a 0–1 home loss against CF Sant Rafel. His first senior goal came on 11 September in a 1–3 loss at CD Ferriolense, and on 23 October he scored a brace in a 3–1 home win against SD Formentera.

In July 2017 Ramos moved to San Fernando CD; initially assigned to the reserves in the regional leagues, he made his first team debut on 1 October 2017 by playing the last 23 minutes in a 1–0 away win against UD Las Palmas Atlético in the Segunda División B championship.

Ramos scored his first goal for Sanfer on 22 October 2017, netting the first in a 3–2 home win against Real Murcia. He subsequently established himself as a starter for the side, scoring a double in a 4–2 away defeat of Lorca Deportiva CF on 5 November.

On 3 January 2018, Ramos signed a three-and-a-half-year deal with Segunda División side Real Valladolid. He made his professional debut ten days later, replacing goalscorer Jaime Mata in a 1–0 away win against FC Barcelona B.

Ramos contributed with six appearances for the Blanquivioletas during the campaign, achieving promotion to La Liga. He made his debut in the main category of Spanish football on 17 August 2018, starting in a 0–0 away draw against Girona FC.

On 31 August 2018, Ramos joined Sevilla Atlético on a season-long loan. On 2 September of the following year, he moved to fellow third division side CD Badajoz also in a temporary deal.

On 2 October 2020, Ramos agreed to a one-year loan deal with Segunda División side CD Lugo. He scored his first professional goal on 21 October, netting his team's third in a 3–0 home win over Girona FC.

On 17 August 2021, Ramos signed a permanent three-year contract with the Galicians. On 31 January 2023, he signed a five-and-a-half-year contract to rejoin his hometown club Cádiz CF, now being assigned to the first team in the top tier.

References

External links

1997 births
Living people
Footballers from Cádiz
Spanish footballers
Association football forwards
La Liga players
Segunda División players
Segunda División B players
Tercera División players
Real Valladolid players
Sevilla Atlético players
CD Badajoz players
CD Lugo players
Cádiz CF players